The Eiffel Bridge is a bridge over the Tsemistskal river, on the Borjomi–Bakuriani railway near the town of Tsagveri.

History

Grand Duke Michael Nikolaevich of Russia ordered the bridge from the French engineer-constructor and bridge builder Gustave Eiffel.

The construction of the bridge started in 1897 over the Tsemistskal River. The construction of the bridge was carried out by the constructor Besarion Keburia . From January 1902, the first "Kukushka" train passed through the Borjomi-Bakuriani narrow-gauge railway line and over the bridge.

References

External Links
travelinborjomi.ge
ambebi.ge

Bridges in Georgia (country)